Arba is a comune (municipality) in the Province of Pordenone in the Italian region Friuli-Venezia Giulia, located about  northwest of Trieste and about  northeast of Pordenone.

Arba borders the following municipalities: Cavasso Nuovo, Fanna, Maniago, Sequals, Spilimbergo, Vivaro.

References

External links
Official website

Cities and towns in Friuli-Venezia Giulia